E. Mason Hopper (December 6, 1885 – January 3, 1967) was an American film director of the silent era. He directed more than 70 films between 1911 and 1935.

Filmography

Director

 The Regenerates (1917)
 The Hidden Spring (1917)
 The Tar Heel Warrior (1917)
 Wife or Country (1918)
 Boston Blackie's Little Pal (1918)
 Her American Husband (1918)
 Unexpected Places (1918)
 As the Sun Went Down (1919)
 Dangerous Curve Ahead (1921)
 From the Ground Up (1921)
 Hold Your Horses (1921)
 All's Fair in Love (1921)
 Brothers Under the Skin (1922)
 The Glorious Fool (1922)
 Hungry Hearts (1922)
 Daddy (1923)
 The Love Piker (1923)
 Janice Meredith (1924)
 The Crowded Hour (1925)
 Paris at Midnight (1926)
 The Wise Wife (1927)
 Getting Gertie's Garter (1927)
 The Night Bride (1927)
 The Rush Hour (1928)
 Square Shoulders (1929)
 Their Own Desire (1929)
 Wise Girls (1929)
 Shop Angel (1932)
 Alias Mary Smith (1932)
 Malay Nights (1932)
 Sister to Judas (1932)
 Hong Kong Nights (1935)

Actor
 Slightly Dangerous (1943) - Man in Newspaper Office (uncredited)
 The Man from Down Under (1943) - Desk Clerk (uncredited)
 Big Jack (1949) - Townsperson (uncredited)
 Riding High (1950) - Spectator (uncredited)
 Sunset Boulevard (1950) - Doctor (uncredited)

References

External links

1885 births
1967 deaths
Film directors from Vermont
People from Enosburgh, Vermont